Lisebergbanan is a steel roller coaster at the Liseberg amusement park in Gothenburg, Sweden. It opened in 1987.

The ride's name literally means "Liseberg rail line" and the station is themed to a railway station. A themed restaurant was later opened under Lisebergbanan's station with a similar theme, allowing guests to dine inside replica freight and passenger carriage compartments. The ride has five trains consisting of 11 cars. Each car seats two riders and as such, the ride boasts a large guest throughput.

History

When Anton Schwarzkopf's company went bankrupt, Schwarzkopf worked with Zierer to produce several roller coasters. Lisebergbanan was the first of these rides, and it has been said that this was Schwarzkopf's favorite roller coaster. The roller coaster opened in 1987 and has been regarded by the park since as a 'true classic'.

Accident

In 2006, 21 people were injured at Liseberg when two of the roller coaster's trains collided. The crash happened as the chain that pulls trains up the initial climb malfunctioned, causing a fully loaded train to roll backward into the starting platform, hitting another train that was unloading riders. Since only part of the train was on the lift hill, the anti-rollback could not stand the pressure, and broke. Since the accident, the roller coaster has opened again after a technical adjustment.

Rankings

Photos

Sources

External links 
 Lisebergbanan at Schwarzkopf Coaster Net
 YouTube Onboard video of ride

Amusement rides based on rail transport
Roller coasters manufactured by Zierer
Roller coasters introduced in 1987
Liseberg
Roller coasters in Sweden
1987 establishments in Sweden
Articles containing video clips